Diana Jeanette Rickard (born 5 October 1953), also known by her married name Diana van Hamburg, is an Australian former competition swimmer.  She competed at the 1968 Summer Olympics in the 100-metre backstroke and 200-metre and 400-metre individual medley events, but failed to reach the finals.

She married the Dutch Olympic swimmer Roger van Hamburg.  Since about 2000 they run a swimming school near Sydney, Australia. Their daughter Sasha is married to Adam Pine, also an Olympic swimmer.

References

See also
 List of Commonwealth Games medallists in swimming (women)

1953 births
Living people
Australian female backstroke swimmers
Australian female medley swimmers
Olympic swimmers of Australia
Swimmers at the 1968 Summer Olympics
Swimmers at the 1970 British Commonwealth Games
Commonwealth Games medallists in swimming
Commonwealth Games bronze medallists for Australia
20th-century Australian women
Medallists at the 1970 British Commonwealth Games